A. T. M. Shamsul Huda was a Bangladeshi civil servant and former Chief Election Commissioner of Bangladesh.

Career
Huda joined the Pakistan Civil Service in 1966. He joined Bangladesh civil service after the Independence of Bangladesh. He retired from service in 2000. He served as Sub Divisional Officer in Bagerhat, Secretary in the Ministry of Water Resources and Ministry of Finance and before that the Managing Director of the Bangladesh Agriculture Development Bank. He served as Chief Election Commissioner of Bangladesh and held the Bangladesh national elections in 2008.

References

Living people
1943 births
Chief Election Commissioners of Bangladesh
Honorary Fellows of Bangla Academy